Lygropia is a genus of snout moths in the subfamily Spilomelinae of the family Crambidae. It currently comprises 66 species, which are mostly found in the tropical and subtropical regions of the Americas, Africa and Asia, but not in Australia.

The genus is placed in the tribe Agroterini.

Species

Lygropia acastalis (Walker, 1859)
Lygropia acosmialis (Mabille, 1879)
Lygropia amplificata (Warren, 1896)
Lygropia anaemicalis Hampson, 1912
Lygropia anthracopis Meyrick, 1934
Lygropia antithetis Meyrick, 1937
Lygropia arenacea Hampson, 1899
Lygropia atrinervalis Hampson, 1910
Lygropia aureomarginalis (Gaede, 1916)
Lygropia bicincta Hampson, 1912
Lygropia bilinealis (Walker, 1866)
Lygropia cernalis (Guenée, 1854)
Lygropia chrysozonalis Hampson, 1912
Lygropia cosmia Dyar, 1912
Lygropia cosmophilopis Meyrick, 1934
Lygropia disarche Dyar, 1914
Lygropia distorta (Moore, 1885)
Lygropia erythrobathrum Dyar, 1914
Lygropia euryclealis (Walker, 1859)
Lygropia falsalis Dyar, 1918
Lygropia flavicaput (Warren, 1896)
Lygropia flavinotalis Hampson, 1912
Lygropia flavivialis Hampson, 1912
Lygropia flavofuscalis (Snellen, 1887)
Lygropia fusalis Hampson, 1904
Lygropia glaphyra Dyar, 1914
Lygropia haroldi Dyar, 1914
Lygropia holoxanthalis Holland, 1900
Lygropia hyalostictalis Hampson, 1912
Lygropia hypoleucalis Hampson, 1912
Lygropia imparalis (Walker, 1866)
Lygropia joasharia Schaus, 1940
Lygropia joelalis Schaus, 1940
Lygropia leucocepsalis Hampson, 1912
Lygropia leucophanalis Mabille, 1900
Lygropia leucostolalis Hampson, 1918
Lygropia melanoperalis Hampson, 1912
Lygropia memmialis (Walker, 1859)
Lygropia murinalis Schaus, 1912
Lygropia nigricornis Hampson, 1898
Lygropia ochracealis (Saalmüller, 1880)
Lygropia ochrotalis Hampson, 1912
Lygropia orthotoma Meyrick, 1933
Lygropia phaeocraspia Hampson, 1912
Lygropia phaeoneuralis Hampson, 1912
Lygropia phaeoxantha Meyrick, 1933
Lygropia plumbicostalis (Grote, 1871)
Lygropia pogonodes Hampson, 1912
Lygropia poltisalis (Walker, 1859)
Lygropia polytesalis (Walker, 1859)
Lygropia rheumatica Meyrick, 1936
Lygropia rivulalis Hampson, 1899
Lygropia rotundalis (C. Felder, R. Felder & Rogenhofer, 1875)
Lygropia schematospila Meyrick, 1937
Lygropia shevaroyalis Hampson 1908
Lygropia silacealis (Amsel, 1956)
Lygropia straminea Hampson, 1912
Lygropia sumatralis Swinhoe, 1916
Lygropia szentivanyi (Munroe, 1968)
Lygropia tetraspilalis Hampson, 1912
Lygropia tripunctata (Fabricius, 1794)
Lygropia unicoloralis (Guenée, 1854)
Lygropia viettalis (Marion, 1956)
Lygropia vinanyalis Viette, 1958
Lygropia xanthozonalis (Hampson, 1895)
Lygropia yerburii (Butler, 1886)

Former species
Lygropia egerialis (Snellen, 1899), transferred to Placosaris in Pyraustinae
Lygropia octonalis (Zeller, 1873), transferred to Conchylodes

References

 
Spilomelinae
Crambidae genera
Taxa named by Julius Lederer